was a professional wrestling event promoted by DDT Pro-Wrestling (DDT). It took place on March 21, 2016, in Tokyo, Japan, at the Ryōgoku Kokugikan. It was the twentieth event under the Judgement name. The event aired domestically on Fighting TV Samurai.

Storylines
Judgement 2016 featured fourteen professional wrestling matches that involved different wrestlers from pre-existing scripted feuds and storylines. Wrestlers portrayed villains, heroes, or less distinguishable characters in the scripted events that built tension and culminated in a wrestling match or series of matches.

Event
The dark match was a King of Dark Championship tag team match. Per the rules of the championship, had Seiya Morohashi pinned anyone during the match, they would have become the new champion.

The first match of the undercard, was a 13-woman battle royal presented by Tokyo Joshi Pro Wrestling.

Next were two tag matches presented respectively by DDT New Attitude and Basara, two sub-brands of DDT.

On the main card, the first match the "Right To Challenge Anytime, Anywhere Contract Battle Royal", a Rumble rules match for a KO-D Openweight Championship match at Max Bump 2016, on April 24. Four envelopes were suspended above the ring, three of which contained a "Right To Challenge Anytime, Anywhere" contract, giving the right to their holder to challenge any champion at any time in the following year. The last envelope contained a "Right To Date Aja Kong" contract. Grabbing a contract resulted in being eliminated from the match.

Next was a three-way tag team match involving Joey Ryan and Candice LeRae, a real life couple wrestling as the "World's Cutest Tag Team".

Next was a tag match involving LiLiCo, a TV personality who was the reigning Ironman Heavymetalweight Champion going into the match. Since this title is defended under a 24/7 rule, LiLiCo was effectively defending her title during the match.

Next was a match involving the veteran Tatsumi Fujinami.

Next was the "Ultimate Royale Barbed Wire PowerPoint No Power Blast PWF Rules match", in which Kendo Kashin was defending the DDT Extreme Championship against Super Sasadango Machine. Per the rules of the title, Kanshin chose the rules of the match: Sasadango could activate the "Ultimate Royale mode" allowing his masked allies to intervene in the match for a short period of time, Sasadango's personal computer (usually used to give comedic PowerPoint presentation) was sitting at ringside wrapped in barbed wire, disconnected from any power source and was set to explode after five minutes had gone by. PWF rules were used which meant that countouts were 10-counts instead of the more traditional 20-counts used in Japan.

The next match was the "East & West Toward The Front Over The Entire Surface Falls Count Anywhere Weapon Treasure Hunt three-way tag team match", a falls count anywhere weapons match involving Jun Kasai from Pro-Wrestling Freedoms and Kenso from All Japan Pro-Wrestling.

In the next match, Yukio Sakaguchi faced Minoru Suzuki from Pro Wrestling Noah.

Next, Danshoku Dino faced former sumo wrestler Akebono.

Results

KO-D Openweight Title #1 Contendership & Right To Challenge Anytime, Anywhere Contract Battle Royal

Footnotes

References

External links
The official DDT Pro-Wrestling website

2016
2016 in professional wrestling
Professional wrestling in Tokyo
Professional wrestling anniversary shows